Prnalija may refer to:
 Prnalija, Karbinci, North Macedonia
 Prnalija, Radoviš, North Macedonia